Chapel Hill Historic District is a national historic district located at Chapel Hill, Orange County, North Carolina.  The district encompasses 46 contributing buildings, 2 contributing structures, and 2 contributing objects on the central campus of the University of North Carolina at Chapel Hill and surrounding residential sections of Chapel Hill.  The district's buildings date from 1795 to the early-20th century and include notable examples of Classical Revival and Jacobean Revival architecture.  Located in the district and separately listed are the Chapel of the Cross, Old East, building and Playmakers Theatre.  Other notable contributing resources are the Davie Poplar, Old West (1822), South Building (1798), the Old Well, Person Hall (1797), Gerrard Hall (1822), New East (c. 1860), New West, the Joseph Caldwell Monument (1858), the Y.M.C.A. Building, Battle-Vance-Pettigre11 Dormitory (1913), Horace Williams House (1854), the Phillips Law Office, the Phillips House (1856), the Old Methodist Church (1853), Senlac (1843, 1876), Hippol Castle (1920s), and Battle Park.

It was listed on the National Register of Historic Places in 1971, and enlarged in 2015.

References

Historic districts on the National Register of Historic Places in North Carolina
Neoclassical architecture in North Carolina
Buildings and structures in Chapel Hill-Carrboro, North Carolina
National Register of Historic Places in Orange County, North Carolina